Maria Odete Ferreira Fiúza (born 19 December 1972) is a Portuguese Paralympic athlete who competes in international elite events. She specialises in the marathon.   She has competed at six Paralympic Games from 2000 to 2020 Summer Paralympics. 

She competed at the 2002 IPC Athletics World Championships, 2007 IBSA World Games, winning a silver medal in the 5000 meters and bronze medal in the 1500 meters, and 2011 IBSA World Games.

She was a member of the European Paralympic Committee.

References

External links 

 Odete Fiúza, paralimpios.pt
 Odete Fiúza e Manuel Mendes | Diplomas Paralímpicos, Sep 5, 2021

1972 births
Living people
Paralympic athletes of Portugal
People from Leiria
Athletes (track and field) at the 2000 Summer Paralympics
Athletes (track and field) at the 2004 Summer Paralympics
Athletes (track and field) at the 2008 Summer Paralympics
Athletes (track and field) at the 2012 Summer Paralympics
Athletes (track and field) at the 2016 Summer Paralympics
Athletes (track and field) at the 2020 Summer Paralympics
Portuguese female middle-distance runners
Portuguese female long-distance runners
Portuguese female marathon runners
Medalists at the World Para Athletics European Championships